Asura horishanella is a moth of the family Erebidae. It is found in Taiwan.

References

horishanella
Moths described in 1927
Moths of Taiwan